Ged Corcoran (born 28 March 1983) is an Irish professional rugby league coach who is the head coach of Ireland and a former professional rugby league footballer. 

Ged Corcoran is the elder brother of the Rochdale Hornets rugby league footballer Wayne Corcoran and is a first team coach with the Sheffield Eagles.

Background
Corcoran was born in County Offaly, Ireland.

International honours
Ged Corcoran was named in the Ireland training squad for the 2008 Rugby League World Cup, and the Ireland squad for the 2008 Rugby League World Cup.

References

External links
 (archived by archive.is) Toulouse Olympique v Halifax RLFC
 (archived by archive.is) Northern Rail Cup Launch
 (archived by web.archive.org) Senior Squad at rli.ie
 (archived by web.archive.org) Tonight’s team news
Hudson is suspended for two years
Search for "Ged Corcoran" at bbc.co.uk

1983 births
Living people
Dewsbury Rams players
Expatriate rugby league players in England
Expatriate rugby league players in France
Halifax R.L.F.C. players
Ireland national rugby league team coaches
Ireland national rugby league team players
Irish expatriate rugby league players
Irish expatriate sportspeople in England
Irish expatriate sportspeople in France
Irish rugby league players
Limoux Grizzlies players
Oldham R.L.F.C. players
Rugby league players from County Offaly
Rugby league props
Rugby league second-rows
Sheffield Eagles players
Toulouse Olympique players